International Apparel Federation (IAF), established in 1976., is an international trade association whose membership includes national clothing associations and companies whose core business is sourcing, designing, development, manufacturing, distribution, and retailing of apparel products.

In 2002, Umut Oran, president of Turkey's Clothing Manufacturers' Association (TGSD) took over the presidency of the IAF.

References

External links 
 

Organizations established in 1976
Clothing-related organizations
Trade associations based in the Netherlands